Shohrat Zakir (born August 1953) is an ethnic Uyghur politician of China and the former Chairman of the Xinjiang Uyghur Autonomous Region and the Chinese Communist Party Deputy Committee Secretary of Xinjiang from 2014 to 2021. Since October 2017, he is the member of the Central Committee of the Chinese Communist Party. He was born in Yining (Ghulja). He went to Tianjin University. He was the former Mayor of Ürümqi. He studied computer science in Hubei Province.

Career
Zakir was born into a family with revolutionary history. His grandfather Kaur Zakir was a progressive thinker during the warlord era and was executed by state agents of the warlord Sheng Shicai along with Mao Zemin and Chen Tanqiu. His father Abdullah Zakrof was one of the earliest ethnic Uyghurs to join the Xinjiang party organization shortly after the foundation of the People's Republic in 1949. Prior to the Cultural Revolution, Zakir's father was a member of the regional standing committee and Vice-Chairman of Xinjiang.

Between 1970 and 1972, Zakir was involved in the "Down to the Countryside Movement" in rural Xinjiang. He then worked as a teacher in an elementary school in Ürümqi. He was transferred to Diwobao school in 1974. In March 1978, he left his homeland for Hubei to attend the Jianghan Petroleum College (now Yangtze University) located in Jingzhou to study computer science. He then returned to Xinjiang to serve as a researcher at an earth sciences institute. In June 1984, he joined government, working for the regional economic committee.

Between 1982 and 1986, Zakir obtained an English degree at the Urumqi Vocational College. During this time he also joined the Chinese Communist Party. He then worked in a series of roles supporting economic growth and trade in the regional government. In March 2001, he was named mayor of Urumqi. Beginning in December 2005 he worked for the Xinjiang Production and Construction Corps. In 2007, he also earned an Executive MBA from Tianjin University. At the 2008 National People's Congress Zakir was selected to become a member of the National Ethnic Affairs Committee of the National People's Congress. In June 2011, he became Vice-Chair of the State Ethnic Affairs Commission. In January 2014, he became Chairman of the Xinjiang People's Congress and in December 2014, he was named Chairman of Xinjiang, replacing Nur Bekri.

In March 2019, addressing the issue of the widespread internment of ethnic minorities in Xinjiang, Zakir said that the camps were "training centers" rather than "concentration camps" as otherwise claimed and that the freedom of "trainees" was not restricted and that the camps were boarding schools where trainees could go home or ask for leave.

On 23 October 2021, he was appointed vice chairperson of the National People's Congress Ethnic Affairs Committee.

On March 11, 2023, he was elected as the lowest-ranking Vice-Chairman of the 14th Standing Committee of the National People's Congress.

U.S. Sanctions 
On 10 December 2021, the U.S. Department of the Treasury added Zakir to its Specially Designated Nationals (SDN) list. Individuals on the list have their assets blocked and U.S. persons are generally prohibited from dealing with them.

References 

Chinese Communist Party politicians from Xinjiang
Living people
1953 births
Mayors of Ürümqi
Tianjin University alumni
Uyghur politicians
Political office-holders in Xinjiang
People's Republic of China politicians from Xinjiang
People from Ili
Members of the 19th Central Committee of the Chinese Communist Party
Delegates to the 10th National People's Congress
Delegates to the 11th National People's Congress
Delegates to the 12th National People's Congress
Delegates to the 13th National People's Congress
Specially Designated Nationals and Blocked Persons List